Enipeus or Enipeas may refer to:

Enipeus (mythology), a river god in Greek mythology
Enipeus (Elis), a river in rising near Salmone (Elis), Elis, Greece
Enipeas (Thessaly), a river in Thessaly, Greece
Enipeas (Pieria), a small river in Pieria (regional unit), Greece
Enippeas, a town in Thessaly, Greece